The 1950 Baltimore Colts season was their fourth as a franchise and only season in the National Football League.

The team matched its previous season's record of 1–11. It failed to qualify for the playoffs for the second consecutive season.

The 1950 Colts hold the distinction of being the only team in NFL history to allow more than 50 points in four different regular season games. The 462 points (38.5 points-per-game) the Colts surrendered is the most of any NFL team in the decade of the 1950s. In their week six loss to the Rams, the Colts became one of only two teams in NFL history to surrender 70 or more points in a regular season contest.

Schedule

Standings

References

Baltimore Colts (1947–1950) seasons
Baltimore Colts